Sinclair Island may refer to:
 Sinclair Island (Antarctica)
 Sinclair Island (Namibia)
 Sinclair Island (Queensland), Australia
 Sinclair Island (South Australia)
 Sinclair Island (Washington), USA

See also
 Sinclair Islet, Queensland, Australia